ARA Cormorán (Q-15) is a hydrographic survey boat of the Argentine Navy, built in the Río Santiago Shipyard and based in Buenos Aires. The vessel is named after the cormorant, a seabird that inhabits Argentina’s littoral, and is the fourth Argentine naval ship with this name.

Design 

Cormorán is a coastal and fluvial research ship designed by the engineering team at Río Santiago Shipyard, where it was built. Its hull has a metallic structure covered with cedar wooden planks, and its superstructure is made of aluminium.

It is powered by two diesel engines driving two propellers, and has a Decca TM 1226 navigation radar.

History 

Cormorán was built in the Río Santiago Shipyard. Commissioned by the Argentine Navy in February 1964, she was assigned to the Naval Hydrographic Service ( Servicio de Hidrografía Naval).

Since then she has undertaken several campaigns, which included depth sounding, current measuring, water sampling and bottom sampling.

In 2010 she supported the hydrographic surveys performed in the Río de la Plata by the Uruguayan ship ROU Sirius.

In 2012 she surveyed the inner Río de la Plata, and in 2013 sounded the rivers Paraná Ibicuy and Paraná Pavón; during 2014 she surveyed the Magdalena Channel of the Río de la Plata.

See also 
 List of auxiliary ships of the Argentine Navy

References

Notes

Bibliography

Other sources

Further reading

External links 
 

Research vessels of Argentina
Ships built in Argentina
1964 ships
Survey ships